Balombo is a town and municipality in Benguela Province in Angola. The municipality had a population of 108,965 in 2014.

References

Populated places in Benguela Province
Municipalities of Angola